Shanghai Bound is a lost 1927 American silent adventure film directed by Luther Reed and written by John F. Goodrich, Ray Harris, Julian Johnson, and E.S. O'Reilly. The film stars Richard Dix, Mary Brian, Charles Byer, George Irving, Jocelyn Lee, Tom Maguire, and Frank Chew. The film was released on October 15, 1927, by Paramount Pictures.

Cast
Richard Dix as Jim Bucklin
Mary Brian as Sheila
Charles Byer as Payson
George Irving as Louden
Jocelyn Lee as Shanghai Rose
Tom Maguire as Smith
Frank Chew as Yen
Allan Cavan	
Tom Gubbins as Local Agent
Arthur Hoyt as Algy
Tetsu Komai as Scarface

References

External links

Stills at richarddix.org

1927 films
American adventure films
1927 adventure films
Paramount Pictures films
American black-and-white films
Lost American films
American silent feature films
Films set in China
Films directed by Luther Reed
1927 lost films
Lost adventure films
1920s English-language films
1920s American films
Silent adventure films